is the 22nd single by Japanese entertainer Miho Nakayama. Written by Nakayama (under the pseudonym "Issaque") and Yoshimasa Inoue, the single was released on July 16, 1991, by King Records.

Background and release
"Rosa" is the first collaboration between Nakayama and musician Yoshimasa Inoue. Prior to the recording of the song, Nakayama originally titled it  before settling with the current title to match its flamenco motif.

"Rosa" became Nakayama's fifth straight No. 3 on Oricon's weekly singles chart. It sold over 362,000 copies and was certified Gold by the RIAJ.

Nakayama performed the song on the 42nd Kōhaku Uta Gassen in 1991.

Track listing
All lyrics are written my Issaque; all music is composed by Yoshimasa Inoue; all music is arranged by ATOM.

Charts
Weekly charts

Year-end charts

Certification

References

External links

1991 singles
1991 songs
Japanese-language songs
Miho Nakayama songs
King Records (Japan) singles